Primča Vas is a small village south of Ambrus in the Municipality of Ivančna Gorica in central Slovenia. The area is part of the historical region of Lower Carniola. The municipality is now included in the Central Slovenia Statistical Region.

References

External links
Primča Vas on Geopedia

Populated places in the Municipality of Ivančna Gorica